G.O.O.D. Morning, G.O.O.D. Night, is the second studio album by Chicago-based artist Malik Yusef. It features collaborations with Kanye West and several performers signed to his label GOOD Music. The project contains two CDs, "Dusk" and "Dawn", each of which has a special meaning:  

However these were released separately. Originally, each album had 12 songs, representing the 24 hours of the day, however Malik announced later that each album would feature 15 tracks. The project was intended to bring together the strongest Chicago-based artists. The project features many other GOOD Music artists, including Big Sean, Really Doe, Common, Mr Hudson, GLC and John Legend, alongside well-known Hip Hop artists including KRS-One, Twista, and Paul Wall, and operatic contralto AnnaMaria Cardinalli. The release of the album figures in the 2013 book by Cardinalli Crossing the Wire: One Woman's Journey into the Hidden Dangers of the Afghan War.  The album was released on June 2, 2009.

 Track listing 

References

2009 albums
Albums produced by Kanye West
GOOD Music albums
Spoken word albums by American artists